Upama Kumari Dev is a Nepalese politician who is elected member of Provincial Assembly of Madhesh Province from People's Socialist Party, Nepal. Dev is a resident of Rajbiraj. She is also a Deputy Speaker of Provincial Assembly of Madhesh Province, took office on 16 February 2018.

References

External links

Living people
21st-century Nepalese women politicians
21st-century Nepalese politicians
Members of the Provincial Assembly of Madhesh Province
People from Rajbiraj
People's Socialist Party, Nepal politicians
1974 births